Twist is the thirteenth novel by Swedish author Klas Östergren. It was published in 2014.

References

External links

2014 Swedish novels
Novels by Klas Östergren
Swedish-language novels
Novels set in Stockholm
Natur & Kultur books